J. W. Westcott II is a boat known for its delivery of mail to ships while they are underway. It operates out of Detroit, Michigan, and is the only floating ZIP Code in the United States.

History 
The Westcott company was established in 1874 by Captain John Ward Westcott, who ferried supplies (and by 1895 the mail) to passing ships via rowboat. By 1949, the company commissioned Paasch Marine Service of Erie, Pennsylvania to build J.W. Westcott II, named in honor of the Westcott company's founder. A single screw is powered by a  marine diesel engine. The boat's speed is rated at 15 knots.

Operation 

Any mail addressed to members of ships' crews on vessels transiting the Detroit River can be delivered to them via J. W. Westcott II by being addressed "Vessel Name, Marine Post Office, Detroit, Michigan, 48222." The mail is delivered to the appropriate ships (mainly lake freighters) as they transit the Detroit River, utilizing ropes and buckets.

Sinking 
On 23 October 2001, J. W. Westcott II sank in the deep water under the Ambassador Bridge while caught in the wake of Norwegian oil tanker MT Sidsel Knutsen. The captain and one other crew member were killed; the two passengers, both pilots, were rescued. J. W. Westcott II was later salvaged, refurbished and returned to service.

See also

References

Further reading

External links 

J. W. Westcott Co. website*

1946 ships
Detroit River
Maritime incidents in 2001
Transportation in Michigan
United States Postal Service
Ships built in Erie, Pennsylvania